Amanullah Nezami is an Afghan entrepreneur and Hindi film collector. Nezami is known for holding the largest private collection of Indian films and music produced between 1940-1980. Sahara India Pariwar produced a documentary on his life and collection.

Nezami moved to Saudi Arabia from Afghanistan where he started and expanded a chain of successful restaurants, Al Khalifa.

He travels to India on yearly bases where he meets his favorite actors and gifts them unique items, such as a photo of Lata Mangeshkar on boxes of chocolates.

His collection includes more than 5000 titles produced over four decades.

References

Afghan businesspeople
Living people
Year of birth missing (living people)